Powerscourt may refer to:

Powerscourt (horse) (born 2000), a thoroughbred racehorse
Powerscourt cocktail, a brandy-based cocktail
Powerscourt Covered Bridge, a Canadian McCallum truss bridge
Powerscourt Estate, County Wicklow, Ireland
Powerscourt Golf Club, on the estate
Powerscourt House, Dublin, a townhouse
Powerscourt Waterfall, Glensoulan Valley on the River Dargle, County Wicklow, Ireland
Lord Francis Powerscourt, a fictional detective
Viscount Powerscourt, a title in the Irish peerage